Fethi Missaoui (born January 8, 1974) was a Tunisian boxer. Missaoui won the light welterweight bronze medal at the 1996 Summer Olympics.

Olympic results 
Defeated Lee Trautsch (Australia) 25-9
Defeated Francie Barrett (Ireland) 18-6
Defeated Mohamed Alalou (Algeria) 16-15
Lost to Oktay Urkal (Germany) 6-20

Pro career
Missaoui turned pro in 1998 and his career ended abruptly due to an eye injury in 2001.  He retired undefeated (12-0-0).

References
 
 sports-reference

1974 births
Living people
Boxers at the 1996 Summer Olympics
Olympic boxers of Tunisia
Olympic bronze medalists for Tunisia
Olympic medalists in boxing
Tunisian male boxers
Medalists at the 1996 Summer Olympics
Light-welterweight boxers
20th-century Tunisian people